This article details the Bradford Bulls rugby league football club's 2019 season. This is the Bulls 1st season back in the Championship after gaining promotion from League 1 by beating Workington Town 27-8 in the play off final.

Season Review

August 2018

It was announced that first team prop forward James Davies left the club to sign for rugby union side Huddersfield RUFC. Recruitment for the new season started as on loan prop forward Callum Bustin signed a permanent contract with the Bulls until the end of 2019. Bradford brought some experience into the squad with the signing of veteran Super League centre Jake Webster from Castleford Tigers on a 2 Year Deal. Prop James Green who was on loan from Castleford Tigers signed a 1 Year Deal with the Bulls after a successful loan spell.

September 2018

Centre Ashley Gibson signed a 1 Year extension to his contract. Welsh international winger Dalton Grant also signed a 1 Year extension after scoring 18 tries in the previous season. It was also announced that former prop forward Jon Magrin would return to the club after a year with the Sheffield Eagles. Academy products Alix Stephenson (fullback), Elliot Culling (centre) and Thomas Doyle (hooker) all signed contracts for the first team following in the footsteps of Oliver Wilson, Matthew Storton, Rowan Milnes and Evan Hodgson. Young Hunslet R.L.F.C. winger David Foggin-Johnston agreed to sign a 1 Year Deal at the Bulls. Home grown fullback Brandon Pickersgill signed a 2 Year extension to stay at the Bulls until the end of 2020.

October 2018

Young hooker and academy product Reiss Butterworth signed for Super League side Huddersfield Giants on a 3-year deal after not featuring for the Bradford side in 2018. 2018 loanee Mikey Wood also put pen to paper on a permanent deal as he signed a 1 Year contract to join the Bulls for 2019 from the Huddersfield Giants. Continuing to recruit for the new season the Bulls announced the capture of seasoned hooker/halfback Matty Wildie on a 1 Year Deal from RFL Championship side Featherstone Rovers. Following this, the Bulls announced that hooker Vila Halafihi had departed the club later to sign a 1-year deal at Hunslet R.L.F.C. Further good news was released by the club as winger Jy Hitchcox signed a 2 Year Deal with the club from Castleford Tigers despite interest from Toronto Wolfpack and London Broncos. Bradford re-signed free scoring back rower Elliot Minchella for 3 years on a full-time deal keeping him at Odsal Stadium until the end of the 2021 season. Further recruitment in the pack came in the form of Featherstone Rovers second rower Connor Farrell who signed a 2 Year Deal to play for Bradford. Captain and workhorse prop Steve Crossley signed a new 2 Year Deal with the Bulls. In a double coup for the club Joe Keyes signed a full time 2 Year Deal with the club, whilst out of contract halfback Dane Chisholm also signed up for 1 Year.

November 2018

The month started off with the announcement that the Bulls would host RFL Championship rivals York City Knights on Boxing Day. It was also revealed that the Bulls would face Super League side Huddersfield Giants on 13 January 2019 for Michael Lawrence's testimonial. The fixtures for the 2019 campaign were also released and Bradford would kick off their return to the Championship with a home match against Featherstone Rovers, it was also revealed that the Bulls would take on local rivals Halifax R.L.F.C. in the 2019 Summer Bash at Bloomfield Road. Young backrower Danny King left the club and subsequently signed a 1 Year Deal with Dewsbury Rams. Former player and current Wales assistant coach Garreth Carvell was brought to the Bulls to continue working under John Kear as his assistant. Prop forward Jordan Andrade also left the Bulls to link up with Dewsbury on a 1 Year Deal.

December 2018

December saw the Bulls sign ex Super League centre Rhys Evans on a 1 Year Deal from Leigh Centurions. Following this capture it was also revealed that the Yorkshire Cup would be resurrected after a 26 year absence in the form of a pre-season cup with Bradford, Batley Bulldogs, Dewsbury Rams, Featherstone Rovers, Halifax R.L.F.C., Hunslet R.L.F.C., Hunslet Club Parkside and York City Knights all participating. The Bulls will face Halifax at Odsal Stadium on 6 January. Bradford released their 2019 squad number with fullback Gregg McNally taking the number 1 shirt and new signings Jake Webster, Jy Hitchcox and Matty Wildie taking numbers 3, 5 and 9. During an interview owner Andrew Chalmers revealed that the Bulls would host Canadian side Toronto Wolfpack in a Friday night friendly on January 25. Young reserve player Harvey Burnett left the Bulls to join Dewsbury on a 1 Year Deal. The Bulls got their pre-season off to a winning 
start with a 20-12 victory over York.

January 2019

The new year started off with the news that fullback Gregg McNally would be released on compassionate grounds in order to move closer to his home in Leigh to care for his ill wife. The Bulls beat local rivals Halifax R.L.F.C. 26-16 in the resurrected RFL Yorkshire Cup meaning they progressed to a semi final against Dewsbury Rams. Following this win Bradford announced that they would face Toronto Wolfpack in a friendly on the 25 January in the Transatlantic Cup. The Bulls revealed that trialist Trae O'Sullivan signed a permanent deal with the club after impressing coach John Kear against Halifax. The Yorkshire Cup run continued as Bradford defeated Dewsbury 20-18 in the semi final earning their place in the first Yorkshire Cup final in over 25 years. The following day saw Bradford lose 56-12 to Super League side Huddersfield Giants in Michael Lawrence's testimonial, halfback Dane Chisholm scored a length of the field intercept try whilst new signing David Foggin-Johnston also crossed however the Super League side ran rampant as the Bulls finished the match with most of their Under 19's on the field. The Bulls claimed their first piece of silverware for the 2019 season as they won the Yorkshire Cup with a hard fought 14-12 win against Batley Bulldogs. The month ended with the Bulls losing 48-12 to Toronto in the final pre-season friendly.

February 2019

Bradford opened their 2019 Betfred Championship campaign with a hard fought 17-16 win over Featherstone Rovers. The Bulls also signed Toronto Wolfpack prop forward Olsi Krasniqi on a one month loan due to an injury crisis in the forward pack. Following their opening round victory the Bulls backed this up with a 31-12 win over Swinton Lions. The first loss of the season came in the form of a 24-10 defeat by Sheffield Eagles with prop forward James Green receiving a red card. The month finished on a sour note for the Bulls as they fell to a 24-14 home defeat by last seasons rivals York City Knights, winger Ethan Ryan scored a brace of tries.

Milestones

Round 1: Jake Webster, Rhys Evans, Matty Wildie and Connor Farrell made their debut for the Bulls.
Round 1: Jake Webster scored his 1st try for the Bulls.
Round 2: Matty Wildie and Rhys Evans scored their 1st try for the Bulls.
Round 3: Olsi Krasniqi made his debut for the Bulls.
Round 6: David Foggin-Johnston made his debut for the Bulls.
Round 7: Connor Farrell and David Foggin-Johnston scored their 1st try for the Bulls.
Round 7: Elliot Minchella kicked his 1st goal for the Bulls.
Round 8: Ethan Ryan scored his 75th try and reached 300 points for the Bulls.
Round 8: Rowan Milnes kicked his 1st goal for the Bulls.
Round 9: Rowan Milnes scored his 1st try for the Bulls.
Round 10: Ross Peltier made his 50th appearance for the Bulls.
Round 12: Thomas Doyle made his debut for the Bulls.
Round 12: Thomas Doyle scored his 1st try for the Bulls.
Round 12: Ethan Ryan scored his 10th hat-trick for the Bulls.
CCR6: Ross Oakes made his 50th appearance for the Bulls.
CCR6: Dalton Grant scored his 25th try and reached 100 points for the Bulls.
Round 15: Alix Stephenson made his debut for the Bulls.
1895 Cup Round 2: Cameron Berry, Joe Brown, Ryan Butterworth, Elliot Culling, Keelan Foster, Bradley Gallagher, Cobi Green, Jake Lightowler, Ethan O'Hanlon and Ebon Scurr made their debuts for the Bulls.
1895 Cup Round 2: Alix Stephenson kicked his 1st goal for the Bulls.
Round 18: Elliot Minchella made his 50th appearance for the Bulls.
Round 18: Joe Keyes reached 300 points for the Bulls.
Round 19: Joe Keyes scored his 1st hat-trick for the Bulls.
Round 19: Elliot Minchella scored his 5th hat-trick for the Bulls.
Round 22: Ethan Ryan scored his 11th hat-trick for the Bulls.
Round 24: Steve Crossley made his 100th appearance for the Bulls.
Round 24: Mikey Wood made his 50th appearance for the Bulls.
Round 26: Joe Keyes reached 400 points for the Bulls.
Round 27: Dalton Grant scored his 2nd hat-trick for the Bulls.
Round 27: Ethan Ryan kicked his 1st goal for the Bulls.

Pre-season friendlies

Bulls score is first.

Player appearances
Friendly games only

 = Injured

 = Suspended

Table

Fixtures and results

2019 Championship

Player appearances
Championship only

 = Injured

 = Suspended

Challenge Cup

Player appearances
Challenge Cup games only

1895 Cup

Player appearances
1895 Cup games only

Squad statistics

 Appearances and points include (Super League, Challenge Cup and Play-offs) as of 8 September 2019.

Transfers

In

Out

References

2019 in rugby league by club
2019 in English rugby league
Bradford Bulls seasons